was a Japanese film actor. He appeared in more than one hundred Jidaigeki films from 1955 to 1967.

Biography 

Born in Tokyo, the son of a Yanagibashi geisha, he was soon adopted by the Ono (小野) family. His adoptive father was a kabuki actor named Takinoyo Ichikawa II (二代目市川瀧之丞), who trained him in dance and kabuki acting from an early age.

In November 1935, he made his kabuki stage debut as Omemaru Ichikawa (市川男女丸) and quickly got the attention of Kikugorō Onoe VI (六代目尾上菊五郎), who took him under his wing as part of a long line of great onnagata (actors who play women's parts in kabuki).

In October 1944, he was adopted by Chiyo Terashima (寺島千代), wife of Kikugorō Onoe VI, inheriting the family name of Niwa (丹羽) to become . At the time, he also appeared on the kabuki stage as Hashizo Okawa II (二代目大川橋蔵) for the first time.

In 1955, he made his film debut at the request of Mitsuo Makino (マキノ光雄), with the Jidaigeki film A Warrior's Flute (笛吹若武者) opposite Hibari Misora (美空ひばり).

Working exclusively for Toei, Okawa quickly became the studio's most popular star appearing in many films, and headlining a number of series, including eight films as Shingo Aoi, the illegitimate son of Shōgun Yoshimune Tokugawa.

After appearing in at least 113 films over a twelve-year period from 1955 to 1967, he moved on to television playing the same role he did in his final theatrically released film, the Edo period detective Heiji Zenigata, which he portrayed in 888 TV episodes over the next 18 years until his death from colon and liver cancer at age 55 in 1984.

Hashizo Okawa is recorded in the Guinness Book of Records as the longest running actor in a one-hour long television series for his performance as Heiji, and is still considered one of the most popular Japanese film stars of all time.

Filmography

Films

Television

References

Notes

External links
 
 

1929 births
1984 deaths
People from Tokyo
Japanese male film actors